This is a list of some well-known periodic functions. A definition is given for some of the following functions, though each function may have many equivalent definitions.

Smooth functions 

All trigonometric functions listed have period , unless otherwise stated. For the following trigonometric functions:
  is the th up/down number,
  is the th Bernoulli number

Non-smooth functions 

The following functions have period  and take  as their argument.

Vector-valued functions 

 Epitrochoid
 Epicycloid (special case of the epitrochoid)
 Limaçon (special case of the epitrochoid)
 Hypotrochoid
 Hypocycloid (special case of the hypotrochoid)
 Spirograph (special case of the hypotrochoid)

Doubly periodic functions 

 Jacobi's elliptic functions
 Weierstrass's elliptic function

Notes

Mathematics-related lists
Types of functions